Jean-Pierre St-Louis (1951 – 9 April 2020) was a Canadian photography director and videographer.

Biography
St-Louis began his feature film career in 1987 alongside Robert Morin and Lorraine Dufour as a photography director for Tristesse modèle réduit. He collaborated in numerous other films throughout his career. Between 1977 and 1991, he directed several short-length and medium-length films thanks to grants from the Canada Council, such as Fait divers : elle remplace son mari par une T.V. (1982), Carapace: autoportrait d’un chanteur inconnu (1984), and Zapping : une histoire de salon (1991).

Filmography
Scale-Model Sadness (Tristesse modèle réduit) - 1987
Requiem for a Handsome Bastard (Requiem pour un beau sans-coeur) - 1992
Windigo - 1994
Whoever Dies, Dies in Pain (Quiconque meurt, meurt à douleur) - 1997
Les siamoises - 1998
Post Mortem - 1999
La Vie la vie - 2001
Operation Cobra (Opération cobra) - 2001
The Negro (Le nèg') - 2002
8:17 p.m. Darling Street (20h17 rue Darling) - 2003
Gaz Bar Blues - 2003
Naked Josh - 2004
On the Verge of a Fever (Le Goût des jeunes filles) - 2004
May God Bless America (Que Dieu bénisse l'Amérique) - 2004
Imitation - 2005
Ten Days to Victory - 2005
The Genius of Crime (Le génie du crime) - 2006
Pax Americana and the Weaponization of Space - 2007
Naufrages - 2009
Ladies in Blue (Les Dames en bleu) - 2009
The Four Soldiers (Les Quatre Soldats) - 2013
The Diary of an Old Man (Journal d'un vieil homme) - 2015
A Place to Live (Pour vivre ici) - 2018

Distinctions
Prix Gémeaux (2000)
Prix Gémeaux (2002)
Hommage AFC (2003)

References

External links

1951 births
2020 deaths
Canadian cinematographers
French Quebecers